The 1999 Democratic Progressive Party presidential primary was the selection process by which the Democratic Progressive Party of the Republic of China (Taiwan) chose its candidate for the 2000 presidential election. The DPP candidate for president was selected through a series of member of the party in Thursday, April 15, 1999.

Result

1999 elections in Taiwan
Democratic Progressive Party
Primary elections in Taiwan